Minei Ilyich Kuks (Миней Ильич Кукс, born 1902 - died 1979) was a Soviet graphic artist. He studied art in Irkutsk and Moscow and was a noted illustrator of children's books, e.g. the 1972 edition of A Summer's Evening by Vasily Zhukovsky.

Kuks was a member of the Leningrad Experimental Graphics Laboratory. He was married to another LEGL artist Aleksandra Iakobson.

References

Soviet artists
1902 births
1979 deaths